Delias bagoe is a member of the family Pieridae that lives in the Australasian realm. The caterpillars feed on Loranthaceae plants.

Distribution 
New Ireland, Bismarck Archipelago, Duke of York Island, New Hanover

References 

bagoe
Butterflies described in 1832
Butterflies of Asia
Taxa named by Jean Baptiste Boisduval